Hiram Cassedy Sr. (September 7, 1820 - March 26, 1881) was a judge and state legislator in Mississippi. He served as Speaker of the Mississippi House of Representatives from 1854 to 1856. He represented Franklin County, Mississippi. He served several terms in the Mississippi House.

He was born in Chambersburg, Pennsylvania.

Hiram Cassedy Jr. (July 4, 1846 - ?) served as a state senator from Pike County, Mississippi in 1872 and 1873 and served as a circuit judge.

See also
Reconstruction era

References

1820 births
1881 deaths
19th-century American judges
Members of the Mississippi House of Representatives
Speakers of the Mississippi House of Representatives
Mississippi state senators